Alan Irwin Menken (born July 22, 1949) is an American composer, pianist, singer, music director, and record producer, best known for his scores and songs for films produced by Walt Disney Animation Studios. Menken's music for The Little Mermaid (1989), Beauty and the Beast (1991), Aladdin (1992), and Pocahontas (1995) has each won him two Academy Awards. He also composed the scores and songs for Little Shop of Horrors (1986), Newsies (1992), The Hunchback of Notre Dame (1996), Hercules (1997), Home on the Range (2004), Enchanted (2007), Tangled (2010), and Disenchanted (2022), among others. His accolades include eight Academy Awards, becoming the second most prolific Oscar winner in the music categories after Alfred Newman (who has 9 Oscars), a Tony Award, eleven Grammy Awards, seven Golden Globe Awards, and a Daytime Emmy Award. Menken is one of eighteen people to have won an Oscar, an Emmy, a Grammy, and a Tony ("an EGOT"). He is one of two people to have won a Razzie, an Emmy, a Grammy, an Oscar, and a Tony ("REGOT").

He is also known for his work in musical theater for Broadway and elsewhere. Some of these works are based on his Disney films, but other stage hits include Little Shop of Horrors (1982), A Christmas Carol (1994), and Sister Act (2009).

Menken has collaborated with lyricists such as Muriel Robinson, David Zippel, Howard Ashman, Stephen Schwartz, David Crane, Seth Friedman, Marta Kauffman, Steve Brown, Tom Eyen, David Rogers, Dennis Green, David Spencer, Jack Feldman, Tim Rice, Lynn Ahrens, Glenn Slater, Chad Beguelin, Kyle Hunter, Ariel Shaffir, Seth Rogen, Evan Goldberg, Phil Johnston, Tom MacDougall, Benj Pasek, Justin Paul, and Lin-Manuel Miranda.

Early life 
Alan Irwin Menken was born on July 22, 1949, at French Hospital in Manhattan, to Judith and Norman Menken. His father was a boogie-woogie piano-playing dentist, and his mother was an actress, dancer and playwright. His family was Jewish. Menken developed an interest in music at an early age, taking piano and violin lessons. He began to compose at an early age. At age nine, at the New York Federation of Music Clubs Junior Composers Contest, his original composition "Bouree" was rated Superior and Excellent by the judges.

He attended New Rochelle High School in New Rochelle, New York, and graduated in 1967. Menken remembers: "I'd make up my own Bach fugues and Beethoven sonatas because I was bored with the piano and I didn't want to practice; so I'd go off on tangents". He then enrolled at New York University. He graduated with a degree in musicology in 1971 from the university's Steinhardt School. Menken recalled: "First, I was pre-med. I thought I'd be a dentist like my dad. Finally, I got a degree in music, but I didn't care about musicology. It wasn't until I joined BMI Workshop ... under Lehman Engel, and walked into a room with other composers that I knew this was it." Menken noted that "Before college, I was writing songs to further my dream of being the next Bob Dylan. A lot of guitar songs – I was composing on piano before that." After college, he attended the BMI Lehman Engel Musical Theatre Workshop.

Career

Early career 
After graduating, Menken's plan was to become either a rock star or a recording artist. His interest in writing musicals increased when he joined the Broadcast Music, Inc. (BMI) Musical Theatre Workshop and was mentored by Lehman Engel. From 1974 to 1978, he showcased various BMI workshop works, such as Midnight, Apartment House (lyric by Muriel Robinson), Conversations with Pierre, Harry the Rat and Messiah on Mott Street (lyrics by David Zippel).

According to Menken, during this period, he "worked as a ballet and modern dance accompanist, a musical director for club acts, a jingle writer, arranger, a songwriter for Sesame Street and a vocal coach". He performed his material at clubs like The Ballroom, Reno Sweeny and Tramps.

In 1976, John Wilson reported for The New York Times that members of Engel's BMI Workshop began performing as part of the "Broadway at the Ballroom" series: "The opening workshop program ... featured Maury Yeston and Alan Menken, both playing their piano accompaniment and singing songs they have written for potential musicals." Wilson reviewed a performance at the Ballroom in 1977 where Menken accompanied a singer: "In the current cabaret world, a piano accompanist is no longer expected to merely play piano for a singer. More and more, pianists can be heard joining in vocally, harmonizing with the singer, creating a background of shouts and exclamations or even doing brief passages of solo singing."

Menken contributed material to revues like New York's Back in Town, Big Apple Country, The Present Tense (1977), Real Life Funnies (Off-Broadway, 1981), Diamonds (Off-Broadway, 1984), and Personals (Off-Off-Broadway, 1985). His revue Patch, Patch, Patch ran at the West Bank Cafe in New York City in 1979 and featured Chip Zien. The New York Times reviewer Mel Gussow wrote: "The title song ... refers to a life's passage. According to Alan Menken ... after age 30 it is a downhill plunge."

Menken wrote several shows that were not produced, including Atina, Evil Queen of the Galaxy (1980), with lyrics by Steve Brown. He also wrote The Thorn with lyrics by Brown, which was commissioned by Divine in 1980. This was a parody of the film The Rose, but they could not raise the money to have it produced. He collaborated with Howard Ashman in an uncompleted musical called Babe, with Tom Eyen in Kicks: The Showgirl Musical (1984), and with David Rogers in The Dream in Royal Street, which was an adaptation of A Midsummer Night's Dream. Menken contributed music for the film The Line (1980), directed by Robert J. Siegel.

Breakthrough years 
Menken finally achieved success as a composer when playwright Howard Ashman chose him and Engel to write the music for his musical adaptation of Kurt Vonnegut's novel God Bless You, Mr. Rosewater. The musical opened in 1979 at the WPA Theater to excellent reviews and modest box office. It transferred after several months to the Off-Broadway Entermedia Theater, where it ran for an additional six weeks.

Menken and Ashman wrote their next musical, Little Shop of Horrors, for a cast of only 9 performers, including a puppeteer. This musical is based on the 1960 black comedy film The Little Shop of Horrors. It opened at WPA Theater in 1982 to warm reviews. It moved to the Off Broadway Orpheum Theatre in the East Village, Manhattan, where it ran for five years. The musical set the box-office record for highest grossing Off-Broadway show of all time. It toured around the world, won theater awards and was adapted as a 1986 musical film starring Rick Moranis that earned Menken and Ashman their first Oscar nomination for the song "Mean Green Mother from Outer Space". For his body of work in musical theatre, he was awarded the BMI Career Achievement Award in 1983.

In 1987, Menken and lyricist David Spencer's adaptation The Apprenticeship of Duddy Kravitz, based on the 1959 novel of the same name, was produced in Philadelphia. After substantial re-writes, it was produced in 2015 in Montreal. In 1992, the WPA Theatre produced Menken's Weird Romance, also with lyrics by Spencer. Menken's musical based on the Charles Dickens novella A Christmas Carol, with lyrics by Lynn Ahrens and book by Mike Ockrent, debuted at Madison Square Garden's Paramount Theater in 1994. The show proved successful and was an annual New York holiday event.

Disney Renaissance and later films 
On the strength of the success of Little Shop of Horrors, Menken and Ashman were hired by Walt Disney Studios to write the music for The Little Mermaid (1989). The challenge was to create an animated musical film of this Hans Christian Andersen fairy tale that could sit alongside the Disney films Snow White and the Seven Dwarfs and Cinderella. The Little Mermaid opened to critical and commercial success and signaled a new Disney era called the Disney Renaissance. The film gave them their first Oscar win: Best Song for the song "Under the Sea". Menken also won the 1989 Oscar for Best Score.

Menken and Ashman's Beauty and the Beast garnered them three 1991 Oscar nominations for Best Song, winning for its title song. Menken won another Oscar for Best Score. The two were working on Aladdin at the time of Ashman's death in 1991. Ashman wrote only three songs in the film and Menken collaborated with Tim Rice, who was then working on The Lion King, to write the rest of the songs for the film. The film won an Oscar in 1992 for Best Song, "A Whole New World". Menken also won the Oscar for Best Score. Menken's live action musical film Newsies, with lyrics by Jack Feldman, was released in 1992.

Three more animated musical films followed. Menken collaborated with Stephen Schwartz for Pocahontas, for which the two won two Oscars: Best Song and Best Musical or Comedy Score. In 1996, the same musical team created the songs, and Menken, the score, for The Hunchback of Notre Dame. In 1997, Menken reunited with his early collaborator, David Zippel, for his last film in the era, Hercules.

Menken also wrote the music for the Michael J. Fox vehicle Life with Mikey (1993), the holiday film Noel (2004) and Mirror Mirror (2012). His other film scores for Disney have included Home on the Range (2004), the Tim Allen remake of The Shaggy Dog (2006), Enchanted (2007), and Tangled (2010).

In March 2017, Disney released a live-action adaptation of Beauty and the Beast, directed by Bill Condon, with the songs from the 1991 film and new material by Menken and Rice. Menken collaborated with Benj Pasek and Justin Paul on writing new songs for the 2019 live-action version of Aladdin, directed by Guy Ritchie.

Menken is also working on new music for a live-action film adaptation of The Little Mermaid, directed by Rob Marshall, with longtime The Little Mermaid fan Lin-Manuel Miranda, whom Menken knew since the former's childhood, as Miranda went to the same school as Menken's niece. Menken will also once again be working with Stephen Schwartz to write new songs for Disenchanted, the sequel to Enchanted, and for a remake of The Hunchback of Notre Dame, which Menken will score. Menken is also working alongside former Disney chief creative officer John Lasseter on a project at Skydance Animation. On May 20, 2020, the project was revealed to be Vicky Jenson's Spellbound. Menken will co-write songs for Spellbound alongside collaborated with lyricists David Zippel and Glenn Slater, with whom he worked on Home on the Range and Tangled. Menken is also reportedly attached to a sequel to Aladdin.

With eight Academy Awards, only composer Alfred Newman (nine wins), art director Cedric Gibbons (11 wins) and Walt Disney (22 wins) have received more Oscars than Menken. He is tied for fourth place with late costume designer Edith Head, and currently holds the record for the most wins for a living person.

Return to musical theatre 
Menken debuted on Broadway with a musical theatre adaptation of Beauty and the Beast that opened in 1994 and ran for 13 years before closing in 2007. In 1997, he collaborated with lyricist Tim Rice on a musical, King David, based on the biblical character, which was performed in a concert version on Broadway at the New Amsterdam Theatre. Little Shop of Horrors played on Broadway from 2003 to 2004.

He next created the stage version of The Little Mermaid, which played on Broadway from 2008 to 2009 and for which he received a nomination for a Tony Award for Best Score. Menken's stage adaptation of Sister Act premiered in London in 2009, and opened on Broadway in 2011. He was nominated for another Tony Award for Best Score. Menken received a star on the Hollywood Walk of Fame in 2010. In December 2010, he was a guest on the NPR quiz show Wait Wait... Don't Tell Me!.

In 2012, Menken won a Tony Award for Best Score for his musical adaptation of Newsies, which ran until 2014. He also wrote the music for Leap of Faith, which had a brief run on Broadway in 2012. His stage adaptation of Aladdin opened on Broadway in 2014, earning him another Tony nomination for Best Score. In 2013, he was a guest at the annual Junior Theatre Festival in Atlanta, Georgia, and was honored with the Junior Theater Festival Award. He gave a concert there, including music that was cut from various productions, while talking about his creative process.

Menken's stage adaptation of The Hunchback of Notre Dame played at La Jolla Playhouse, California, in 2014. The Apprenticeship of Duddy Kravitz was revived in Montreal in 2015, and A Bronx Tale: The Musical played at the Paper Mill Playhouse in 2016. Menken is currently working on stage musical adaptations of Night at the Museum and Animal Farm.

As of 2019, Menken is reuniting with his Newsies creators Jack Feldman and Harvey Fierstein to develop a new musical called Greetings from Niagara Falls. A reading was held in January 2019; however, there is no word on future plans for the project at this time.

Television work 
From 1989 to 1990, Menken and Howard Ashman wrote songs for the popular puppet TV show Sesame Street. In 2008, Menken said that his work on Sesame Street was "pathetic money, but it still had some prestige to it. It was on the air and [he] was getting some royalties". The duo also wrote a song titled "Wonderful Ways to Say No" for the 1990 animated anti-drug special Cartoon All-Stars to the Rescue.

In 2015, Menken co-composed the score for the musical television series Galavant alongside Christopher Lennertz, reuniting him with Tangled screenwriter Dan Fogelman. Menken also co-wrote songs for the series alongside Glenn Slater. The series lasted two seasons, first airing on January 4, 2015, and last airing on January 31, 2016. In 2017, Menken and Slater returned to write songs for the animated series Rapunzel's Tangled Adventure, which is set after the events of Tangled. The series ended in 2020, after three seasons. On July 26, 2020, Menken and Slater won the Daytime Emmy Award for Original Song in a Children's, Young Adult or Animated Program for the song titled "Waiting in the Wings".

Menken wrote songs for a prospective prequel/spin-off series to 2017's Beauty and the Beast titled Little Town, which would be centered on Gaston and LeFou. The series would be released on Disney's streaming service, Disney+, and Menken would also be an executive-producer on the series. In February 2022, it was reported that the series would not go forward for now.

Personal life 
Menken was introduced to ballet dancer Janis Roswick while working with the Downtown Ballet Company. They have been married since November 1972 and live in North Salem, New York. They have two daughters, Anna Menken and Nora Menken.

Filmography

Film

Television

Musicals 

 Dear Worthy Editor (Off-Broadway, c.1974)
  Book by Judy Menken
Based on the letters-to-the-editor of Jewish-American newspaper Daily Jewish Forward
 Kurt Vonnegut's God Bless You, Mr. Rosewater (Off-Broadway, 1979)
 Lyrics by Howard Ashman and Dennis Green
 Based on a 1965 novel by Kurt Vonnegut
 Little Shop of Horrors (Off-Broadway, 1982; West End, 1983; Broadway, 2003)
 Lyrics by Ashman
 Based on the 1960 black comedy film
 Weird Romance (Off-Broadway, 1992)
 Lyrics by David Spencer
 Two one-act musical: Based on "Her Pilgrim Soul" and "The Girl Who Was Plugged In"
 Beauty and the Beast (Broadway, 1994; West End, 1997)
 Lyrics by Ashman and Tim Rice
 Based on the 1991 Disney film
 A Christmas Carol (Madison Square Garden, 1994–2003)
 Lyrics by Lynn Ahrens
 Based on 1843 novella by Charles Dickens
 King David (Broadway, 1997)
 Lyrics by Rice
 Based on the Biblical books of Samuel, 1 Chronicles and Psalms
 Der Glöckner von Notre Dame (Berlin, 1999)
 Lyrics by Stephen Schwartz
 Based on the Disney film and the 1831 novel by Victor Hugo
 The Little Mermaid (Broadway, 2008)
 Lyrics by Ashman and Glenn Slater
 Based on the Disney film
Sister Act (West End, 2009; Broadway, 2011)
 Lyrics by Slater
 Based on the 1992 comedy film
 Leap of Faith (Broadway, 2012)
 Lyrics by Slater
 Based on the 1992 film
 Newsies (Paper Mill Playhouse, 2011; Broadway, 2012)
 Lyrics by Jack Feldman
 Based on the 1992 film
 Aladdin (Seattle, 2011; Broadway, 2014)
 Lyric by Ashman, Rice and Chad Beguelin
 Based on the 1992 film
 The Hunchback of Notre Dame (La Jolla Playhouse, 2014)
 Lyrics by Schwartz
 Based on the 1996 film and the 1831 novel by Victor Hugo
 The Apprenticeship of Duddy Kravitz (Montreal, 2015)
 Lyrics by Spencer
 Based on the 1959 novel by Mordecai Richler
 A Bronx Tale: The Musical (Broadway, 2016)
 Lyrics by Slater
 Based on the 1990 autobiographical one-man play by Chazz Palminteri
 Hercules (Central Park, 2019)
 Lyrics by David Zippel
 Based on the 1997 Disney film

Other 
 Aladdin, Jr. – 1-act, 7-scene musical adapted from the animated film Aladdin 1992
 Beauty and the Beast Live on Stage – Theatrical show at Disney's Hollywood Studios, Walt Disney World
 Disney's Aladdin: A Musical Spectacular – Theatrical show at Disney California Adventure
 The Hunchback of Notre Dame – Theatrical show at Disney's MGM Studios, Walt Disney World
 The Little Mermaid: Ariel's Undersea Adventure – Attraction at Disney California Adventure
 Sindbad's Storybook Voyage featuring "Compass of Your Heart" – Attraction at Tokyo DisneySea, Tokyo Disney Resort
Dramatists Guild of America YouTube Channel music video featuring "Someone Wrote That Song"
 Tangled: The Musical – Theatrical show on the Disney Cruise Line (starting November 2015)
Dubai Parks and Resorts's official theme song "All the Wonders of the Universe" (opening October 2016)
 Boston Pops Fireworks Spectacular 2017 celebration featuring the world premiere of "The Sum of Us" (lyrics by Jack Feldman) for soloist, chorus, and orchestra (Brian Stokes Mitchell, U.S. Army Soldier's Chorus and the Boston Pops Orchestra)

Awards 

Alan Menken has received eight Academy Awards (and nineteen nominations), eleven Grammy Awards (and twenty-four nominations), one Tony Award (and four nominations), and one Daytime Emmy Award. He has also received seven Golden Globe Awards (and sixteen nominations), one Drama Desk Award (and five nominations), and three Outer Critics Awards.

He was made a Disney Legend in 2002 and was the recipient of a Richard Kirk Career Achievement Award in 1998, a Freddie G. Award for Musical Excellence in 2013, and The Oscar Hammerstein Award in 2013, among others.

The American Film Institute included the title song from the film Beauty and the Beast, in the AFI's 100 Years...100 Songs. Five other songs from his Disney films were nominated:

 "Under the Sea" from The Little Mermaid (1989)
 "Be Our Guest" from Beauty and the Beast (1991)
 "Belle" from Beauty and the Beast (1991)
 "A Whole New World" from Aladdin (1992)
 "Friend Like Me" from Aladdin (1992)

In 2006, AFI listed its 25 greatest movie musicals, with Beauty and the Beast (1991) ranked 22nd. It is the only animated musical film on the list. Four of his other film musicals were also nominated:
 Little Shop of Horrors (1986)
 The Little Mermaid (1989)
 Aladdin (1992)
 The Hunchback of Notre Dame (1996)

In 2019, Menken finally accepted the Razzie Award for "Worst Original Song" he won at the 13th Golden Raspberry Awards (1993) for "High Times, Hard Times" from Newsies (1992), becoming the first person to win a Razzie and Oscar in the same year. Menken wrote the music for the song, and shared the award with lyricist Jack Feldman.

In 2020, Menken reached EGOT status when he won the Daytime Emmy Award for Outstanding Original Song in a Children's, Young Adult or Animated Program for co-writing the song "Waiting in the Wings" for Rapunzel's Tangled Adventure.

References

Further reading 
Disney Biography of Menken
 Britannica Book of the Year, 1997. 2007. Encyclopædia Britannica Online. Retrieved September 6, 2007.
Interview with Alan Menken, theartsdesk.com. Posted May 16, 2010.

External links 

Internet Off-Broadway database Listing
MusicalTalk interview with Alan Menken
 
 The Whole New World of Alan Menken
 Alan Menken: "Beauty and the Beast captures the magic of Disney animations and brings it to the stage" Alan Menken in Barcelona's Beauty and the Beast

 
1949 births
20th-century American composers
20th-century American Jews
20th-century American male musicians
21st-century American composers
21st-century American Jews
21st-century American male musicians
American film score composers
American male film score composers
American musical theatre composers
American television composers
Animated film score composers
Annie Award winners
Best Original Music Score Academy Award winners
Best Original Song Academy Award-winning songwriters
Broadway composers and lyricists
Daytime Emmy Award winners
Golden Globe Award-winning musicians
Grammy Award winners
Jewish American film score composers
Jewish American songwriters
Jewish American television composers
Living people
Male musical theatre composers
Male television composers
Musicians from New Rochelle, New York
People from North Salem, New York
Rocky (film series) music
Skydance Media people
Songwriters from New York (state)
Steinhardt School of Culture, Education, and Human Development alumni
Tony Award winners
Walt Disney Animation Studios people
New Rochelle High School alumni